Crossotus albicollis is a species of beetle in the family Cerambycidae. It was described by Félix Édouard Guérin-Méneville in 1844. It is known from Ethiopia, Burkina Faso, Chad, the Central African Republic, Ghana, Ivory Coast, Cameroon, Senegal, Mali, Morocco, Niger, Nigeria, Kenya, Mauritania, and Western Sahara.

References

albicollis
Beetles described in 1844